Hamburg is the name of some places in the U.S. state of Wisconsin:

Hamburg, Marathon County, Wisconsin
Hamburg (community), Marathon County, Wisconsin
Hamburg, Vernon County, Wisconsin